The Billboard Music Award for Top Radio Song winners and nominees. As of 2016, no artist has won the award multiple times.

Winners and nominees

Superlatives

Nominations
 4: Bruno Mars, Maroon 5
 3: Charlie Puth, Ed Sheeran, The Weeknd
 2: Adele, Pharrell Williams, Wiz Khalifa, Justin Timberlake, The Chainsmokers, Rihanna, Khalid, Justin Bieber, Dua Lipa

References

Billboard awards